Flanderization is the process through which a fictional, formerly complex character's essential traits are oversimplified to being their entire personality, or at least exaggerated while other traits remain, over the course of a serial work. The term Flanderization was coined by TV Tropes in reference to Ned Flanders of The Simpsons, who was caricatured over the show's run from a friendly and good-hearted neighbor among other characteristics while maintaining his Christian faith into a dogmatic, evangelical "bible-thumper". Flanderization has been analyzed as an aspect of serial works, especially television comedies, that demonstrates a work's gradual decline.

Definition and etymology

Flanderization is the process through which a single element of a character's personality, often an originally mild element, is inflated in importance over the course of work until it becomes their primary defining characteristic. The term was coined by TV Tropes, a wiki focused on popular culture, in reference to the character of Ned Flanders. Flanders himself is a complex example of flanderization, having undergone the process in the middle seasons of the show before once again returning to a similar portrayal to his original one. Originating as "perhaps the only genuinely well-meaning, good-natured person in Springfield", Flanders was originally intended to be an ideal ("annoyingly perfect") neighbor who served as a contrast and foil for Homer Simpson. As a devoutly religious and church-going man, his faith was intended to serve as a contrast to Homer's lack of religious sophistication. However, over the course of the show's run, Flanders was simplified into a religious fundamentalist whose Christianity was his primary defining characteristic.

While flanderization is primarily discussed in the context of fictional characters, it has also been applied to real people and historical events.

Examples
Flanderization is a widespread phenomenon in serialized fiction. In its originating show of The Simpsons, it has been discussed both in the context of Ned Flanders and as relating to other characters; Lisa Simpson has been discussed as a classic example of the phenomenon, having been even more flanderized than Flanders himself. The specific case of Ned Flanders has been discussed as a symptom of the general decline of The Simpsons, once one of the most popular sitcoms in television history and once known for how dynamic its characters were.

Other works have also been criticized for Flanderization. Several characters in the American version of The Office, such as Kevin Malone, have been referred to by the term. Family Guy has also been highlighted as a prominent example, particularly with the characters of Brian and Peter Griffin. Other television shows criticized for flanderization include SpongeBob SquarePants, Silicon Valley, and Dragon Ball Super.

Though the primary reference for Flanderization is in television, other fictional media can also have characters exhibit Flanderization. Many film characters have been described as being slandered in a sequel or franchise compared to their original portrayal. Flanderization in cinema is particularly prevalent in horror films, especially slasher films. Flanderization has also been described as a pitfall for tabletop role-playing games, where complex characters are often played for long periods of time by amateur writers. The practice of building roleplay characters around single quirks has been mentioned as a frequent cause of Flanderization. As well as player characters, non-player characters in role-playing games are frequently slandered, due to the need for a single game master to play multiple characters.

Flanderization has also been discussed in the context of real-world phenomena, such as subcultures that are slandered by the mainstream culture into simpler and more accessible forms; one example of this is the beatnik stereotype of the Beat Generation. Another example of real-world Flanderization is the tendency for musicians, especially those associated with social media such as TikTok and SoundCloud, to simplify their musical personas after finding some commercial success. Musicians accused of Flanderization include Lil Pump, Lil Yachty, and Flo Milli.

Interpretation
Flanderization has been described as symptomatic of a decline in writing quality. It has been used as an argument against making sequels for a work and described as "a lesson for other shows" whose characters have not gone through the process. Some works have consciously attempted to avoid flanderization, such as Rick and Morty.

The specific case of Ned Flanders attracts special attention. Debate exists over whether Flanders is a consistently slandered character or whether he later returned to a more complex, dynamic portrayal. The appropriateness of the term "Flanderization" has also been disputed, as many characters in The Simpsons have undergone the caricaturing process, and Flanders himself may not be the most extreme case. Flanders' shifting portrayal has also been controversial as representative of a shift in media portrayals of religious people. As both the primary representative of Christianity on The Simpsons and as one of the most significant Christian fictional characters in the world, the simplification of Ned Flanders as a character has been the subject of criticism, study, and reinterpretation.

See also
Characterization
Jumping the shark
Radicalization
Typecasting
Stock character

References

External links

Flanderization on TV Tropes

Internet slang
Television criticism
The Simpsons
Media analysis
Popular culture studies